Semyon Grigorivich Gendin (1902 in Daugavpils – February 23, 1939) was head of the foreign military intelligence agency of the Soviet Army General Staff of the Soviet Union. He served in the Cheka, the Joint State Political Directorate and NKVD. His rank was equivalent to that of a Soviet Red Army Komdiv (division commander). He was a recipient of the Order of Lenin (1937), the Order of the Red Banner (1927, 1938) and the Jubilee Medal "XX Years of the Workers' and Peasants' Red Army" (1938). During the Great Purge, he was arrested on October 22, 1938, sentenced to death by the Military Collegium of the Supreme Court of the Soviet Union on February 22, 1939 and executed the next day.

Bibliography
 Гендин С. Г. // 
 
 

1902 births
1939 deaths
Military personnel from Daugavpils
People from Dvinsky Uyezd
Latvian Jews
Jews from the Russian Empire
Soviet Jews in the military
Recipients of the Order of Lenin
Recipients of the Order of the Red Banner
Great Purge victims from Latvia
Jews executed by the Soviet Union